Bosco is an unincorporated community in Ouachita Parish, Louisiana, United States. The community is positioned off U.S. Route 165 near the boundary with Caldwell Parish and is located 12 miles north of Columbia, 15 miles south of Monroe and 23 miles west of Winnsboro.

History
It was named after the Boscobel plantation.

Negro league baseball player Sam Holmes was born in Bosco.

References

Unincorporated communities in Ouachita Parish, Louisiana
Unincorporated communities in Louisiana
Unincorporated communities in Monroe, Louisiana metropolitan area